Euterpeae is a tribe of Neotropical plants in the family Arecaceae. Genera in the tribe are:

Hyospathe – northern South America
Euterpe – South America, Central America
Prestoea – northern South America, Caribbean
Neonicholsonia – Central America
Oenocarpus – South America

See also 
 List of Arecaceae genera

References

External links 

 
Monocot tribes